Candelariella is a genus of bright yellow, ocher, or greenish yellow crustose or squamulose lichens in the family Candelariaceae. Members of the genus are commonly called eggyolk lichens, goldspeck lichens, or yolk lichens. The genus was circumscribed in 1894 by Swiss lichenologist Johannes Müller Argoviensis, with Candelariella vitellina assigned as the type species.

Characteristics 
The key feature of Candelariella species are the distinct yellow apothecia. Although all species are very small, even the smallest can be identified by the lemon-yellow to orange-yellow discs. Most species have a yellow thallus, although Candelariella antennaria is one example with a grey thallus. Some species are pycnidiate. This genus will generally have all spot tests emerge as negative, although K tests may have an orange or reddish colour on some species' apothecia.

Spore count between species varies from 8 to 32 simply or thinly septate spores. Spores often hold one to two oil drops.

Habitat and distribution
Candelariella species are found across the globe, although most commonly described in North America, Asia, and Australia. Species can be found on calcareous and non-calcareous rock, soil, tree bark, mosses, and other lichens. While some species may grow only on rock, and others only on trees, the more generalist species can be found in a variety of locations.

Ecology
As of 2016, 16 lichenicolous fungi have been documented parasitising species of the genus Candellariella. These are: Tremella candelariellae, Polysporina subfuscescens, Sarcogyne sphaeospora, Arthonia almquistii, Caloplaca grimmiae, Carbonea vitellinaria, Trichonectria furcatosetosa, Lichenochora arctica, Sarcopyrenia cylindrospora, Zwackhiomyces lecanorae, Phoma candelariellae, Henfellra muriformis, Ascochyta candelariellicola, Taeniolella delicata, Intralichen christiansenii, and Intralichen lichenicola.

Species

Candelariella aggregata 
Candelariella antennaria 
Candelariella arctica 
Candelariella aurella 
Candelariella australiensis  – Australia
Candelariella biatorina 
Candelariella blastidiata 
Candelariella boikoi 
Candelariella boleana  – Europe
Candelariella borealis  – North America
Candelariella californica 
Candelariella clarkiae 
Candelariella commutata 
Candelariella complanata 
Candelariella coralliza 
Candelariella corallizoides 
Candelariella corviniscalensis 
Candelariella deppeanae 
Candelariella efflorescens 
Candelariella flavosorediata  – Réunion
Candelariella flavovirella 
Candelariella granuliformis 
Candelariella hakulinenii 
Candelariella immarginata 
Candelariella lichenicola 
Candelariella makarevichiae 
Candelariella medians 
Candelariella reflexa 
Candelariella rosulans 
Candelariella rubrisoli 
Candelariella superdistans 
Candelariella vainioana 
Candelariella vitellina 
Candelariella xanthostigma 
Candelariella xanthostigmoides

References

 
Lichen genera
Taxa named by Johannes Müller Argoviensis
Taxa described in 1894